The 4th Luftwaffe Field Division was an infantry division of the Luftwaffe branch of the Wehrmacht that fought in World War II. It was formed using surplus ground crew of the Luftwaffe and served on the Eastern Front from late 1942 to June 1944 when it was destroyed during Operation Bagration.

Operational history

The 4th Luftwaffe Field Division, one of several Luftwaffe Field Divisions of the Luftwaffe (German Air Force), was formed in mid-1942 in Gross-Born Troop Maneuver Area, under the command of Oberst Rainer Stahel. Intended to serve as infantry, its personnel were largely drawn from surplus Luftwaffe ground crew. In November 1942, it was assigned to Army Group Centre on the Eastern Front. Posted to a sector near Vitebsk, it defended this against Soviet operations.

In November 1943, responsibility for the division was transferred to the Army and it was renamed 4th Field Division (L). Its Field Jager battalions became the 49th, 50th and 51st Jager regiments. Early the following year, it received some of the surviving personnel of the 3rd Field Division (L), which had just been disbanded. In the summer of 1944, the 4th Field Division (L) was still defending Vitebsk as part of the LIII Corps in the 3rd Panzer Army. When the Red Army began the Vitebsk–Orsha Offensive of Operation Bagration on 22 June 1944, the corps was surrounded within days. The division was encircled at Vitebsk and subsequently destroyed with its commander, Generalleutnant Robert Pistorious, killed in action.

Commanders
 Oberst Rainer Stahel (September–November 1942);
 Oberst Wilhelm Völk (November 1942–April 1943);
 Oberst Hans-Georg Schreder (April–November 1943); 
 Generalmajor Hans Sauerbrey (November 1943);
 Generalmajor Ernst Klepp (November 1943–January 1944);
 Generalleutnant Robert Pistorius (January 1944–June 1944).

Notes
Footnotes

Citations

References

 
 

0*004
Military units and formations established in 1942
Military units and formations disestablished in 1944